Carlos Enrique Hernández Ramos (April 21, 1940 – July 2, 2016) was a Venezuelan world champion professional boxer. Known professionally as Carlos Morocho Hernandez (Carlos "Dark Haired" Hernandez), he ended his career following a TKO by Scottish boxer Ken Buchanan.

History 
Carlos Enrique Hernandez Ramos was born on 21 April 1940, in the populous parish of La Pastora, Caracas. For the peculiarity of being dark-haired, was identified for most of his career as "Morocho", but also was known as "Kid Helicoide". His first triumphs in boxing came at the age of 15 years old, earning the titles of Champion of the Federal District and National Featherweight monarch. In his first international tournament, he was included in the Second World Amateur Boxing Championships held in Mexico, where he earned the "Ring of Diamonds".

He was also champion of Central America and the Caribbean and was undefeated after 25 amateur fights. Following his amateur career, which he finished undefeated, he tried his hand at professional boxing, which seemed a more lucrative field to him.

The "Morocho" made the leap to professional boxing under the tutelage of Juancho Medina. His debut was on 25 January 1959 at Nuevo Circo de Caracas, against Felix Gil, at featherweight. On 18 January 1965, Carlos "Morocho" Hernández won the world light-welterweight championship, facing the American Eddie Perkins and giving Venezuela its first world champion.

After a career of successes and excesses, Carlos "Morocho" Hernández, met the end and defeat when he faced, in London, on 11 May 1971 Scotsman Ken Buchanan, to whom Hernandez lost by TKO in the eighth round.

Death
Carlos "Morocho" Hernandez" died in Caracas, Venezuela, on July 2, 2016, due to health complications.

Professional boxing record

See also
List of world light-welterweight boxing champions

References

External links

Carlos Morocho Hernández - CBZ Profile

 

|-

|-

1940 births
2016 deaths
Sportspeople from Caracas
Venezuelan male boxers
World Boxing Association champions
World Boxing Council champions
The Ring (magazine) champions
Light-welterweight boxers
World light-welterweight boxing champions